Jakov Puljić (born 4 August 1993) is a Croatian football forward currently playing for Puskás Akadémia FC in Hungary.

Club career
Having passed through the ranks of HNK Cibalia youth academy, Puljić made his 1. HNL debut for the club on 3 March 2012, when he entered as a substitute in a 2–0 home win to NK Karlovac. Following four seasons with Cibalia, in June 2015 he joined NK Lokomotiva. In January 2016, Puljić
was loaned to NK Inter Zaprešić until the end of the season. Six months later, in July 2016, he transferred outright to Inter Zaprešić. After a prolific 2016–17 season, during which he scored 11 league goals, Puljić caught the attention from other clubs in Croatia. Eventually, on 31 August 2017, he was signed by the Croatian champions, HNK Rijeka, on a season-long loan with a buying obligation.

Club statistics

Honours
Rijeka
Croatian Cup: 2019

References

External links

1993 births
Living people
Sportspeople from Vinkovci
Association football forwards
Croatian footballers
Croatia youth international footballers
HNK Cibalia players
NK Lokomotiva Zagreb players
NK Inter Zaprešić players
HNK Rijeka players
Jagiellonia Białystok players
Puskás Akadémia FC players
Croatian Football League players
First Football League (Croatia) players
Ekstraklasa players
Nemzeti Bajnokság I players
Croatian expatriate footballers
Expatriate footballers in Poland
Croatian expatriate sportspeople in Poland
Expatriate footballers in Hungary
Croatian expatriate sportspeople in Hungary